FoxyTunes was a browser extension allowing control of media players from the web browser window. The company that developed FoxyTunes was bought by Yahoo! in 2008, and FoxyTunes was closed in 2013.

History
In 2004 computer science graduate student Alex Sirota was making Foxytunes available for free and accepting donations. On June 28, 2013, Yahoo! announced FoxyTunes's closure, scheduled for July 1, 2013. At its peak FoxyTunes was available in over 30 languages.

Software
Foxytunes was controlled by a toolbar interface which was installed on the web browser.

Supported web browsers and other applications included Mozilla Firefox, Internet Explorer, SeaMonkey, Mozilla Application Suite, Flock and Mozilla Thunderbird. The extension supported the normal media player functions and displayed currently playing track information. In 2007 the FoxyTunes Planet rich media front page was launched. Additionally, the extension allowed searching various Web sites to get images, lyrics, videos, biographies etc. related to the music being played.

The presentation of the toolbar interface could be altered by a skin extension.  This allowed  a user to select from alternative presentations of the toolbar which had alternative characteristics of colors, layout, size and collapsed state.

Supported players
FoxyTunes supported more than 30 desktop and web-based media players on a diverse variety of platforms.

Microsoft Windows
Apollo media player
The Core Media Player
dBpoweramp Audio Player:
foobar2000 
iTunes
JetAudio
JRiver Media Center
Last.fm
MediaMonkey 
Media Player Classic 
musikCube 
Musicmatch Jukebox
Spotify
Songbird
Sonique
Quintessential Player
Pandora
RealPlayer 
UltraPlayer
VLC media player
Winamp
Windows Media Player
Yahoo! Music Jukebox / Yahoo! Music Engine
Zinf

Linux systems
XMMS
Beep Media Player 
Noatun 
JuK
Amarok
Music Player Daemon
Rhythmbox

Mac OS X
iTunes

Online services
 Yahoo! News
 Yahoo! Music
 Twitter with TwittyTunes

Reception
FoxyTunes Version 1.0 was reviewed in 2004 by ExtremeTech, in 2005 by Ynet, by Tony Hoffman in "The Best Free Software (2007)" in PCMag and Preston Gralla in PCWorld. It was Claudine Beaumont's favourite in her 2008 article "Firefox 3: Top ten extensions" in The Telegraph. Haaretz reported in 2008 that it had been downloaded by 8 million users. It was reviewed in 2009 by download.com and Softpedia. In 2010 in How-To Geek. In 2011 by Chris Wiles at TechAdvisor/Macworld, and Ghacks.

References

External links

Yahoo May Be Looking To Buy Israel's FoxyTunes TechCrunch

Nonfree Firefox legacy extensions
Yahoo! acquisitions
Internet Explorer add-ons
2005 software
2005 establishments
Proprietary cross-platform software
Internet properties disestablished in 2013
Freeware